Bir Soinik also is a Bangladeshi Bengali-language film.
The film released was 2003 in Bangladesh. director-writer Delwar Jahan Jhantu. Stars Manna, Moushumi, Rosy Samad, Humayun Faridi, Yasmin Bilkis Sathi and many more.

Bir Soinik the film special honored is Manna and Yasmin Bilkis Sathi by National Film Awards of Bangladesh as there won best actor award and best fBest Actress in a Supporting role award 2003.

Plot
At the eve of Liberation War, Mohammad Ali is a military of East Pakistan army. He falls in love with his Superior's daughter Mehnaz and marries her. Mehnaz's father kills Ali's mother and sister with the help of Ramjan Ali. The war breaks out and Sharafat Khan takes away his daughter to Pakistan. After war Ali goes to Pakistan to take back his wife. He returns with his son Abdullah but his wife gets killed by Ramjan Ali. Can Ali find Ramjan Ali to take revenge.

Cast
 Manna as Mohammad Ali / Abdullah
 Moushumi as Rubi
 Yasmin Bilkis Sathi as Mehnaz
 Rosy Samad as Mohammad Ali's Mother (as Rosy Afsari)
 Humayun Faridi as Ramjan Molla
 Asif Iqbal as Akash
 Nasir Khan as Sharafat Khan
 Siraj Haider as Shiraj Miah
 Gangua as Bhai
 Dildar
 Sani Alamgir as Sani Miah
 Himu as Himu
 Bobi as Meghla
 Shahin as Shahin Miah

Music
Bir Soinik film music composed by Anwar Jahan Nantu.

Soundtrack

Award and achievements

National Film Awards
 Winner Best Actor, Manna
 Winner Best Actress in a Supporting role, Saathi

References

Bengali-language Bangladeshi films
Bangladeshi drama films
2003 films
2000s Bengali-language films
2003 drama films
Films scored by Anwar Jahan Nantu